The Clan of Mersevi is one of the biggest clans in Şanlıurfa, Turkey. Members of the clan live in 32 villages between Bozova and Suruç counties. They do not appear on the political scene and there is no unity among them. Nowadays they live in different regions of Turkey.

External links 
 Mersavi Sosyal Yardımlaşma Dayanışma Kültür ve Eğitim Derneği

Ethnic groups in Turkey
Şanlıurfa Province
Clans